Kasia Al Thani (2 October 1976 – 29 May 2022) was the third wife of Abdelaziz bin Khalifa Al Thani, the son of Khalifa bin Hamad Al Thani.

Biography
She was born as Kasia Gallanio in Kraków, Poland, but grew up in Los Angeles, Los Angeles County, California, United States. She met her future husband in Paris who had lived in exile in France since 1992. In 2004, she became his third wife. They had three daughters together: Sheikha Malak, Sheika Yasmin, and Sheikha Reem. In 2007, she launched a luxury gifting shopping company called Savoir-Faire.com, which went into voluntary liquidation in 2010. She discovered fraudulent activity on her husband's account at Barclays Bank in Marbella and spearheaded a €50m/£40m legal action against the bank. In 2009, Barclays settled for an undisclosed amount. Afterwards, she filed for divorce, and the couple fought over custody of their daughters for ten years, after allegations that he sexually assaulted their eldest child. In April 2018, she joined the FC Martigues business team. She resided in Marbella, Spain, where she was found dead of an apparent drug overdose on 29 May 2022.

References

External links
Savoir Faire

1976 births
2022 deaths
Kasia
Polish Muslims
Converts to Sunni Islam from Christianity
Polish emigrants to the United States
Polish emigrants to France
People from Los Angeles